Adam Borzecki is a Polish-German former ice hockey defenseman.

Playing career

Beginning and junior
Adam started playing in his native Poland with his local team Stoczniowiec Gdańsk. He would also play for KH Zagłębie Sosnowiec until the conclusion of the 1996–97 season where he went over to North America to play 2 seasons with the Rimouski Océanic. He would not be selected in the NHL draft but would be signed by the Jackson Bandits of the ECHL.

North America
After a season in the ECHL. Adam would go on to play for 3 additional seasons in the minor leagues of North America for a total of 6 different franchises. During the 2003–04 season he would play one season in the second-tier HockeyAllsvenskan league in Sweden before returning to North America to play one additional season in the minors.

The German leagues
Concluding his stay in North America, would spend the rest of his days playing in the German hockey leagues for 3 different franchises. He retired in 2018.

Personal life
Has a son, Jakub, who also plays hockey. He was born in Syracuse, New York in 2002.

Career statistics

References

External links

1978 births
Living people
Chicago Wolves players
EC Bad Tölz players
Elmira Jackals (UHL) players
Hammarby Hockey (1921–2008) players
Idaho Steelheads (WCHL) players
Jackson Bandits players
KH Zagłębie Sosnowiec players
Manchester Monarchs (AHL) players
Polish ice hockey defencemen
Reading Royals players
Rimouski Océanic players
SC Bietigheim-Bissingen players
Schwenninger Wild Wings players
Stoczniowiec Gdańsk players
Syracuse Crunch players
Utah Grizzlies (IHL) players